Eugene Albert Chappie (March 28, 1920 – May 31, 1992) was a United States Congressman from California. He served as a Republican between 1981 and 1987.

Chappie was born in Sacramento, California. After graduating from high school, he joined the United States Army. Chappie was promoted to the rank of captain while serving in the Pacific Theater during World War II. He returned home to work in agribusiness before serving in the military again, this time during the Korean War.

Chappie entered politics after his tour of duty ended in Korea. He became an El Dorado County Supervisor in 1950. Chappie held this position until his was elected as a Republican to the California State Assembly in 1964. In 1980, he ran for Congress, and he won the first of three terms. In that election, Chappie beat veteran Democratic incumbent Harold "Bizz" Johnson by almost 14 points, becoming the first Republican to represent this vast northern California district since 1942. He was helped by Ronald Reagan easily carrying the district.

He retired in 1987 due to declining health and died on May 31, 1992.

External links

Join California Eugene A. Chappie

1920 births
1992 deaths
Republican Party members of the California State Assembly
United States Army soldiers
United States Army personnel of World War II
United States Army personnel of the Korean War
County supervisors in California
Politicians from Sacramento, California
People from El Dorado County, California
Republican Party members of the United States House of Representatives from California
20th-century American politicians